Agriopoma morrhuanum, or the false quahog, is a species of bivalve mollusc in the family Veneridae. 

It can be found along the Atlantic coast of North America, ranging from Prince Edward Island to North Carolina.

References

External links
 Dall, W. H. (1902). Synopsis of the family Veneridae and of the North American Recent species. Proceedings of the United States National Museum. 26 (1312): 335-412.
 Linsley, J. H. 1845. Catalogue of the shells of Connecticut. The American Journal of Science and Arts 48: 271-286

Veneridae